Wijesooriya Arachchige Raminda Pravinath (born 18 March 1998), known as Raminda Wijesooriya, is a Sri Lankan cricketer. He made his Twenty20 debut for Burgher Recreation Club in the 2017–18 SLC Twenty20 Tournament on 24 February 2018. He made his List A debut for Burgher Recreation Club in the 2017–18 Premier Limited Overs Tournament on 10 March 2018. He made his first-class debut for Burgher Recreation Club in the 2017–18 Premier League Tournament on 11 January 2019.

References

External links
 

1998 births
Living people
Sri Lankan cricketers
Burgher Recreation Club cricketers
Sportspeople from Matara, Sri Lanka